Bob Tucker (April 1, 1943 – March 5, 2017) was an American football player and coach. He served as the head football coach at the College of Wooster from 1985 to 1994, compiling a record of 29–66–1.

Head coaching record

References

1943 births
2017 deaths
Iowa State Cyclones football coaches
Ohio State Buckeyes football coaches
Penn State Nittany Lions football coaches
Wooster Fighting Scots football coaches
Youngstown State Penguins football coaches